Tin Zaouatine (also spelled Tinzouatine) is a commune, coextensive with the district of Tin Zaouatine, in In Guezzam Province, Algeria. According to the 2008 census it has a population of 4,157, up from 2,314 in 1998, with an annual growth rate of 6.2%, the highest rate in the province. Its postal code is 11150 and its municipal code is 1107.

Geography

A series of long, rocky ridges run from north-south to the west of the town.

Climate

Tin Zaouatine has a hot desert climate (Köppen climate classification BWh), with long, extremely hot summers and short, very warm winters. Despite an extremely dry climate, some occasional rainfall occur during the months of August and September due to the influence of the far northern edge of the West African Monsoon, unlike most of the Algerian Desert. Averages high temperatures soar during the height of the long summer season, with daytime highs always over 40 °C (104 °F) during nearly 4 months and even above 45 °C (113 °F), despite the high elevation of the site.

Education

1.9% of the population has a tertiary education, and another 3.6% has completed secondary education. The overall literacy rate is 47.2%, and is 58.1% among males and 35.3% among females; all three figures are the second lowest in the province (after In Guezzam).

Localities
The commune is composed of four localities:

Tinzaouatene
Hassi In Tafouk (eastern part)
Oued Tassamak (western part)
Taouandart

References

Communes of In Guezzam Province
Tuareg